Guts and Glory: The Rise and Fall of Oliver North is a 1989 American drama miniseries written and directed by Mike Robe. It is based on the 1988 book Guts and Glory: The Rise and Fall of Oliver North by Ben Bradlee Jr. The film stars David Keith, Barnard Hughes, Annette O'Toole, Peter Boyle, Paul Dooley and Jim Fitzpatrick. The film aired on CBS in two parts on April 30, 1989, and on May 2, 1989.

Plot

Cast 
David Keith as Oliver North
Barnard Hughes as William J. Casey
Annette O'Toole as Betsy North
Peter Boyle as John Poindexter
Paul Dooley as Robert McFarlane
Jim Fitzpatrick as Sergeant Major Collins
Amy Stoch as Fawn Hall
Bryan Clark as Ronald Reagan
Donald Craig as William Clark
Dakin Matthews as Edwin Meese
Joe Dorsey as Richard Secord
Miguel Ferrer as Scott Toney
Madison Mason as Scott 
Suzanne Snyder as Alicia
Scott Kraft as Deroy
David Spielberg as Weissman
David Sage as Jenner
John Shearin as Ted
Tony Colitti as Harv Konig
Joel Colodner as Richard Stone
Alex Henteloff as Bender
F.J. O'Neil as Colonel Bernhardt
Mike Pniewski as Lieutenant Jacobs
Arlen Dean Snyder as Major General Schweitzer
Michael Wren as Diaz
Dwier Brown as Jeff Simms
Terry O'Quinn as Aaron Sykes
Reid Shelton as Donald Regan
Warren Munson as Lee Hamilton
Thomas Byrd as Robert Owen
Maria Claire as Tait
Anthony De Fonte as Manucher Ghorbanifar
Don Jeffcoat as Stuart
Tom Fuccello as Spitz Channel
Jane Kean as Mrs. Cornwall
Colby Kline as Dornin
Rob Neukirch as Jack

Ratings

References

External links
 

1989 television films
1989 films
1980s American television miniseries
American drama films
1989 drama films
Films directed by Mike Robe
1980s English-language films
1980s American films